Spiridion is a genus of annelids belonging to the family Naididae.

The species of this genus are found in Europe, Russia and Northern America.

Species:

Spiridion insigne 
Spiridion modricensis 
Spiridion phreaticola 
Spiridion scrobicularae

References

Annelids